The Watcher in the Woods may refer to:
 A Watcher in the Woods, a 1976 novel by Florence Engel Randall
 The Watcher in the Woods (1980 film), an American supernatural horror film
 The Watcher in the Woods (2017 film), an American made-for-television horror film